Bugay is a surname. Notable people with the surname include:

Amado Bugay (1954–1977), Filipino martyr and dissident against the Marcos dictatorship
Nikolay Bugay (born 1941), Russian historian
Ryley Bugay (born 1996), American-born Filipino footballer
Saim Bugay (1934–2008), Turkish sculptor

See also
 Buğay, Korgun
 Buğay, Yapraklı